Spooks in Thailand ( or Mun plaiw mak literally: "What a lonely") is a 2014 Thai fantasy-comedy film created by Kittikorn Liasirikun.

Plot
Four short stories from four directors told under one main concept; "ghost is anything".

 (GPS มัน…จะพาไปไหน ??) "Ghost Positioning System": Po took Gong his grandfather, who had a stomachache, to the hospital with the GPS system installed in the car. It turned out to be haunted navigation and lead them to unexpected places.
 (จ่าเฉย มัน…สิงอยู่ที่ไหน): "Sgt Choey & the Zebra": A young biker is chased by a traffic cop figure riding a zebra, even though he was already in the hospital. But it still didn't stop.
 (ตุ๊กตา มัน…เกินตอนไหน) "Buy Two Get One Free": A young married couple travel to China to pray for a child from the god. He also bought the lucky doll back in hopes that it would inspire him to have children. Anomalies occur when they multiply spontaneously.
 (มันจูนเจอตอนไหน… ?) "Mun Plaiw Mak": The last story is a about a man who has just been released from prison, only to find all of the sequel ghosts coming at him.

Cast
Segment "Ghost Positioning System"
Thana Chatborirak as Po
Suthep Po-ngam as Gong (grandpa)
Prachayanan Suwanmanee as GPS (voice)
Segment "Sgt Choey & the Zebra"
Suporn Sangkaphibal as Ms Thank You
Thana Chatborirak as Jack
Kriengsak Hrientong as Sgt Choey (voice)
Segment "Buy Two Get One Free"
Thana Chatborirak as Tue
Chollatorn Pratyarungroj as Jom
Sineenat Bodhivesa as Ma (grandma)
Segment "Mun Plaiw Mak"
Thana Chatborirak as Pae
Pongpant Phetbuntoon as Pup
Yasuhiko Miyauchi as Yasu
Sakarin Suthamsamai as Internee
Special Segment (Overture) "Bua Loi"
Pornpong Piboonthanakiat as Ed
Naiyana Thipsri as Bua Loi Ghost Trader (voice)

Production & reception
Spooks in Thailand or Mun plaiw mak in Thai title is a film in cult genre that born from the idea of filmmaker Kittikorn Liasirikun. It is divided into four segments. All starring by the same actor Thana Chatborirak, a younger brother of famed Pakorn Chatborirak, by playing differently composed roles.

The film was criticized for mocking the political situation at the time.

References

External links
 

2014 films
Thai comedy films
Thai fantasy films
2014 comedy films
2014 fantasy films
2010s monster movies
Thai anthology films
Thai ghost films
Films set in Thailand
Films set in China
Films set in Shanghai
Films directed by Kittikorn Liasirikun